Aaron Sherritt (August 1854 – 26 June 1880) was an associate of the gang of outlaws led by Ned Kelly in Victoria, Australia.

Personal life
Aaron Sherritt was born in the Melbourne suburb of Prahran in August 1854, to Irish migrants John and Agnes Ann (née Nesbitt) Sherritt. He was the eldest of 13 children. He grew up at Woolshed near Beechworth and was a childhood friend of Kelly gang member Joe Byrne. On 26 December 1879, Sherritt married fifteen-year-old Ellen "Belle" Barry.

Kelly Gang
On 26 October 1878 Ned, his brother Dan, Joe Byrne and Steve Hart were outlawed by the colony of Victoria after ambushing a party of police and murdering three policemen at Stringybark Creek. By some accounts, Sherritt offered to join the gang but was talked out of it by Ned Kelly and Joe Byrne.

He was a friend of the outlaws, but gained the trust of Police Superintendent Francis Hare. Traditional accounts of the Kelly Gang portray him as a traitor, but many of the police suspected he was a double agent working for the Kelly Gang. Detective Mick Ward actively worked to increase tensions between Sherritt and the Kelly Gang.

Death and aftermath
Sherritt had made an agreement with Superintendent Francis Hare to accompany him and a party of police to observe the Byrne home in the Woolshed district. They hoped to spot the Kelly gang coming to visit and for Sherritt to obtain the reward for their capture, which now stood at eight thousand pounds. However, after weeks of watching, there was still no sign of the Kelly gang. Unfortunately, Joe Byrne's mother stumbled upon the police camp while gathering kindling. She now knew that Sherritt was an informer.

On 26 June 1880, Sherritt was at home with his pregnant wife, mother-in-law and four policemen, Constables Robert Alexander, Henry Armstrong, Thomas Dowling and William Duross. The police were using the Sherritt residence as a base of operations to watch the neighbours' house, belonging to the mother of Joe Byrne. A neighbour, Anton Wick, who had been handcuffed and held hostage by Joe Byrne and Dan Kelly, called out "Aaron" at the back door of Sherritt's hut. When Sherritt answered it, Byrne shot him at point-blank range in the neck and chest with a double-barrel percussion shotgun. Byrne and Kelly then held the household captive in the house for 2 hours, threatening to burn it down. They then released Anton Wick and stole back into the bush.

Aaron Sherritt's youngest brother was also named Aaron. The younger Aaron Nesbitt Sherritt was born in 1883, after the first Aaron had been shot dead.

References

Bibliography
 Alec Brierley, An Illustrated History of the Kelly Gang (1979)
 Ian Jones, "The Fatal Friendship: Ned Kelly, Aaron Sherrit & Joe Byrne" (2003)
 

1854 births
1880 deaths
Deaths by firearm in Victoria (Australia)
Bushrangers
Australian people of Irish descent